Emporiki may refer to:

 Emporiki Bank, a Greek bank with headquarters in Athens
 Emporiki Autokiniton was a major Greek automobile trading and industrial company